See also Pakal (disambiguation).

Lady Pakal (or Lady Pacal; Mayan Ix Pacal) was a Maya Queen consort of Yaxchilan in Mexico.

It is said that she lived into her sixth k'atun, meaning that she was at least ninety-eight when she died in 705.

Her name means "shield".

Family
Lady Pacal was a daughter of Lady Xibalba and wife of the king (ajaw) Yaxun B'alam III and mother of Itzamnaaj B'alam II.

Her grandson was Yaxun B'alam IV (752–768).

Her possible sister was Lady Xoc and her daughter-in-law was Lady Eveningstar of Calakmul.

See also
Yaxchilan rulers

References

Year of birth unknown
705 deaths
Maya queens
8th-century women